Eleocharis flavescens is a perennial flowering plant species called bright green spikerush, pale spike-rush, or wrinkle-sheathed spike-rush; it is a member of the sedge family, Cyperaceae.  It is clump-forming species that also spreads into colonies.  It is a small species that looks similar to other Spikerush species. It is native to temperate North America,  the West Indies, and South America.

Varieties
There are two varieties.

Eleocharis flavescens var. olivacea (Torr.) Gleason: is found along shorelines in eastern North America along the Atlantic coast and inland south of the Great Lakes to Minnesota. It is a short caespitose plant with biconvex, green to dark brown, achenes. The achenes have a two-cleft style and bristles that are as long or longer than the achene. The scales of the achene are rounded with round tips and have a green midrib. In Minnesota it reaches its most westerly distribution and it is listed as a Threatened species because of its rarity. It is a wetland species found in only a few locations in Minnesota but this may be due to under collecting because the species is small and looks like other species. In Minnesota, it has been found growing on a mucky lakeshore in a mixed forest, and along a muddy shoreline of a peat pond.

Eleocharis flavescens var. flavescens:  with red-brown to dark brown ripe achenes. It grows in southern and western USA, the West Indies, and South America.

References 

Acicularis
Flora of North America
Flora of South America
Freshwater plants